Odell Township may refer to the following townships in the United States:

 Odell Township, Livingston County, Illinois
 Odell Township, New Hampshire in Coos County